The Bocas del Toro Group is a geologic group in Panama. It preserves fossils dating back to the Serravallian to Early Pleistocene period. The group comprises the Swan Cay, Isla Colón, Escudo de Veraguas, Cayo Agua, Shark Hole Point, Nancy Point and Valiente Formations.

See also 
 List of fossiliferous stratigraphic units in Panama

References 

Geologic groups of North America
Geologic formations of Panama
Neogene Panama
Pleistocene Panama
Messinian
Serravallian
Tortonian
Sandstone formations
Siltstone formations
Limestone formations
Deep marine deposits
Shallow marine deposits
Reef deposits
Bocas del Toro Province